Hanekom is an Afrikaans surname. Notable people with the surname include:

Derek Hanekom (born 1953), South African politician
Morné Hanekom (born 1988), South African rugby union player
Stokkies Hanekom (born 1989), South African rugby union player
Christian Hanekom (born 1988) American businessman

Afrikaans-language surnames